A hotel detective is a person in plain clothes hired to monitor the security of a hotel and investigate various security, morality, or rule violations therein. They are distinct from uniformed security guards employed by a hotel.

Hotel detectives are often retired and/or ex-police officers with additional training. They have prominence in certain noir fiction, especially in the works of Raymond Chandler, where detectives are occasionally referred to as "dicks."

See also
 Detective

References

External links
U.S. Bureau of Labor and Statistics: Private Detectives and Investigators 

Hospitality occupations
Detective
Private detectives and investigators